One third of Three Rivers District Council in Hertfordshire, England is elected each year, followed by one year without election.

Political control
Since the foundation of the council in 1973 political control of the council has been held by the following parties:

Leadership
The leaders of the council since 1986 have been:

Council elections
1973 Three Rivers District Council election
1976 Three Rivers District Council election (New ward boundaries)
1979 Three Rivers District Council election
1980 Three Rivers District Council election
1982 Three Rivers District Council election
1983 Three Rivers District Council election
1984 Three Rivers District Council election
1986 Three Rivers District Council election (District boundary changes took place but the number of seats remained the same)
1987 Three Rivers District Council election
1988 Three Rivers District Council election
1990 Three Rivers District Council election
1991 Three Rivers District Council election (Some new ward boundaries & district boundary changes also took place)
1992 Three Rivers District Council election
1994 Three Rivers District Council election
1995 Three Rivers District Council election
1996 Three Rivers District Council election
1998 Three Rivers District Council election
1999 Three Rivers District Council election  (New ward boundaries)
2000 Three Rivers District Council election 
2002 Three Rivers District Council election
2003 Three Rivers District Council election
2004 Three Rivers District Council election
2006 Three Rivers District Council election
2007 Three Rivers District Council election
2008 Three Rivers District Council election
2009 Three Rivers District Council election
2010 Three Rivers District Council election
2011 Three Rivers District Council election
2012 Three Rivers District Council election
2014 Three Rivers District Council election (New ward boundaries)
2015 Three Rivers District Council election
2016 Three Rivers District Council election
2018 Three Rivers District Council election
2019 Three Rivers District Council election
2021 Three Rivers District Council election
2022 Three Rivers District Council election

Changes between elections

1991 boundaries

1999 boundaries

2014 boundaries 

The seat vacated by the death of Liberal Democrat Ann Shaw (Chorleywood South & Maple Cross) was held in a by-election on 13 July 2017 by Phil Williams.

At a by-election on 12 October 2017, the Liberal Democrats' Keith Martin gained Oxhey Hall and Hayling from the Conservatives, whose councillor Ty Harris had resigned.

Alison Wall (Durrants) defected from the Lib Dems to the Conservatives in February 2018.

Martin Brooks (Leavesden) resigned from the Liberal Democrats in March 2018.

See also
 Politics of Three Rivers (district)

References

By-election results

External links
Three Rivers District Council

 
Three Rivers District
Council elections in Hertfordshire
District council elections in England